Saint-Estève XIII Catalan who were previously called Union Treiziste Catalane or UTC for short are a semi-professional rugby league team based in Perpignan in the region of Pyrénées-Orientales in the south of France. Founded in 2000 after a merger between AS Saint-Estève and XIII Catalan the club plays in the Elite One Championship which is the top tier rugby league competition in France. They have won the league title once and the cup four times. Their current home stadium is the Stade Municipal and they are coached by Jerome Guisset

History

Background

In 2000 Bernard Guasch managed to bring together two highly successful Perpignan rugby league clubs in AS Saint Estève and XIII Catalan to form one club which he named Union Treiziste Catalane. The ultimate aim was to join the British Super League. After just one season the club won the Lord Derby Cup beating Limoux Grizzlies 38–17. Saint-Cyprien XIII of the Elite Two Championship and also based in Perpignan joined the merger in 2002. After another cup win in 2003, in season 2004–05 they completed a league and cup double and it was at this time that the club presented a business plan to join the Super League. In 2006 they were admitted into the Super League under a new name Catalans Dragons.

Formation
Saint-Estève XIII Catalan was formed following the Dragons' transfer to the Super League, and began competing in the Elite One Championship, bringing back the names of the original clubs pre-2000. The club acts as a feeder team for Catalans Dragons while also providing a Perpignan presence in the French league. In 2016 the club lifted the cup again.

Colours and Badge 

The team's playing colours are white, red, blue and yellow which are the colours of Catalans Dragons, incorporating the colours of the original clubs from the merger. They also share very similar badges the difference being the team name

Stadium 
 
When the merged team began, they played at the Stade Gilbert Brutus and stayed here until 2015 when they switched to the ground formerly used by AS Saint-Estève in the district of the same name on the outskirts of Perpignan. The ground has floodlights and a main stand that has 2,000 seats. In 2015 the ground hosted its first international match when France A played Serbia.

Current squad 
2021-22 Season

Honours 

 Elite One Championship 
Winners (1): 2018–19Runners-up (1): 2012–13

 Lord Derby Cup
Winners (1): 2015–16Runners-up (2): 2014–15, 2018–19

References 

French rugby league teams
Perpignan
Sport in Pyrénées-Orientales
2000 establishments in France
Rugby clubs established in 2000